Georget is a surname. Notable people with the surname include:

Émile Georget (1881–1960), French road racing cyclist, brother of Léon
Étienne-Jean Georget (1795–1828), French psychiatrist
Léon Georget (1879–1949), French road racing cyclist, brother of Émile 
Philippe Georget (b. 1962), French author of crime novels